The Estadio Olímpico Santa Teresita is a multi-use stadium located in Tepic, Nayarit, Mexico.  It is currently used mostly for football matches and is the home stadium for Coras F.C.  The stadium has a capacity of 4,000 people.

References

External links

Sports venues in Nayarit
Olímpico Santa Teresita
Athletics (track and field) venues in Mexico